Louai Sakka (born 1972) is a Syrian of Turkish background, who was convicted in Turkey of playing a role in several terrorist bombings.
His first conviction was overturned on appeal, and he is currently being re-tried.

Early life
Sakka is the son of a wealthy factory owner in Aleppo, Syria.

Alleged jihadist career
According to The Washington Post, Sakka was suspected of playing a role in a plot to bomb hotels in Amman, Jordan, on 31 December 1999. They reported he was the planner of the truck bomb attacks that killed 57 in Istanbul in 2003; that he was a trusted associate of Abu Musab al-Zarqawi, and had led foreign fighters during the battle of Fallujah; and that he aided other fighters in their travels, with funding and false passports. He was captured in Antalya when a bomb exploded in his apartment on 4 August 2005.

The Washington Post reported that Turkish security officials asserted he had acknowledged that he had been constructing the bomb, which he intended to use as a suicide bomb when he guided a yacht into a cruise ship that had American GIs.

Sakka was represented by Osman Karakan.
Karakan said that Sakka had willingly acknowledged his jihadist activities, and remained committed to jihadism—but was nevertheless refusing to sign a confession.

Sakka is believed to have undergone plastic surgery in order to hide from security officials.

The Washington Post reported that he drank alcohol, and hung out with unmarried women, in order to mask the fact that he was a fundamentalist. Today's Zaman reported Sakka had warned Turkish troops in Afghanistan that they could be faced with “disaster”.

On February 7, 2012, investigators from the United Nations interviewed Sakka, interested in whether he had played a role in the assassination of Lebanon's Prime Minister Refik Hariri.

On 21 March 2012, the judge in Sakka's case barred him from the courtroom, because he was wearing an orange jumpsuit, similar to those made infamous for being issued to Guantanamo captives.

References

1972 births
Living people
People from Aleppo